Rafael Castillo Lazón (born 26 September 1960) is a Peruvian footballer and manager.

Managerial career
Castillo began his managerial career in 2004 with Union Huaral. He subsequently managed U. San Martin, Melgar, José Galvez, Sport Huancayo, Total Chalaco, and Universidad Técnica de Cajamarca.

See also
Peruvian football league system

References

1960 births
Living people
Sportspeople from Lima
Peruvian football managers
Alianza Atlético managers
Universidad San Martín managers
FBC Melgar managers
José Gálvez FBC managers
Unión Comercio managers
Carlos A. Mannucci managers
Universidad Técnica de Cajamarca managers
Atlético Grau managers
Sport Huancayo managers